Anna Marie Roos is a historian of early modern English science, noted for her research on the early Royal Society. She is a professor in the School of History and Heritage at the University of Lincoln, a Fellow of the Society of Antiquaries, a Fellow of the Linnean Society, and the Editor-in-Chief of Notes and Records.

Career 
Anna Marie Roos obtained a PhD in history from the University of Colorado in 1997. She was an assistant and then associate professor at the University of Minnesota Duluth from 1999 to 2006, The Lister Research Fellow at the University of Oxford from 2009 to 2012, and a research associate at the Museum for the History of Science in Oxford from 2009 to 2013. Roos was a visiting fellow at All Souls College, Oxford, Huntington Fellow and Beinecke Fellow (declined) in 2017.

In 2013, Roos began work at the University of Lincoln. She became the Editor-in-Chief of Notes and Records in 2018. Under her editorship, the first in a series of video interviews was published and the number of entries to the Essay prize significantly increased.

Roos was elected Fellow of the Society of Antiquaries in 2013.

Research 
Roos' work concerns early modern English science and the early history of the Royal Society. She studied the naturalist Martin Lister and his daughters Anna and Susanna, who created the images for the book Historiae Conchyliorum and were some of the first women to use a microscope. Roos detailed how Anna and Susanna became illustrators from their teenage years and that their work was used by their father because he considered that even the best professional engravers were not sufficiently reliable. Her book, Martin Lister and his Remarkable Daughters, was published by the Bodleian Library in 2018.

Roos' book Goldfish, one of Reaktion Books' Animal series, was published in September 2019. The book was dedicated to a pet goldfish she owned as a child, named Speedy.

In 2020, during the COVID-19 pandemic, Roos was interviewed by National Geographic on the effect of pandemics on ancient cities. She discussed plague outbreaks and quarantine in Venice in the early modern era.

Her other books are:

Martin Folkes (1690-1754): Newtonian, Antiquary, Connoisseur. Oxford University Press, 2021

Edited with Vera Keller and Elizabeth Yale, Archival afterlives: life, death, and knowledge-making in early modern British scientific and medical archives. Brill, 2018.

The correspondence of Dr Martin Lister (1639-1712) [Volume one 1662-1677]. Brill, 2015. Winner of the John Thackray Medal, Society of the History of Natural History.

Web of Nature: Martin Lister (1639-1712), the first arachnologist. Brill, 2011.

The salt of the earth: natural philosophy, medicine and chymistry in England, 1650-1750. Brill, 2007.

Luminaries in the natural world: the sun and moon in England, 1400-1720. Peter Lang, 2001.

References 

Living people
Year of birth missing (living people)
Historians of science
Fellows of the Linnean Society of London
Academic journal editors
University of Colorado alumni
Women historians
21st-century American historians
Academics of the University of Lincoln